Abeltoppen is a mountain in Dickson Land at Spitsbergen, Svalbard. It is named after Norwegian mathematician Niels Henrik Abel. The mountain has a height of 1,123 m.a.s.l. and is situated between Austfjorden and Dicksonfjorden. The two kilometer long ridge of Abelskuten extends northwards from Abeltoppen.

References

Mountains of Spitsbergen